James W. Robinson, Jr. Secondary School  is a six-year public school in the Commonwealth of Virginia, in the United States. Known as Robinson Secondary School, it is located in Fairfax County, a suburb southwest of Washington, D.C.

Opened  in 1971, Robinson is located south of Braddock Road near George Mason University, and is administered by the Fairfax County Public Schools. It offers the International Baccalaureate program, and has approximately 3,900 students in grades 7–12.  Robinson's school colors are royal blue and gold, and the school mascot is a ram.

History

Robinson was named after Medal of Honor recipient James W. Robinson, Jr., the first resident of Virginia to be awarded the medal during the Vietnam War. Sergeant Robinson, age 25, was fatally wounded under heroic circumstances in South Vietnam  in April 1966, while serving in the infantry in the U.S. Army.

The school opened its doors in September 1971, taking its students from Fairfax, W.T. Woodson, Oakton, and West Springfield high schools. It was the second of Fairfax County's "secondary schools," or "superschools," which housed grades 7–12. Lake Braddock, which opened two years later in 1973, was the third of these schools from this era. The first was Hayfield, near Mount Vernon, which opened in 1968, and the most recent is South County in Lorton, which opened in 2005, taking its students from former Hayfield territory.  South County has since reverted to high school status with the opening of South County Middle School near the school's athletic gym.

Awards and recognitions

Robinson won the 2018–19 Wells Fargo Cup race, which is presented annually to Virginia public high schools that have "demonstrated extraordinary success in academic activities throughout the year". This is the first time Robinson has won the Wells Fargo Cup for Academics.

Demographics
For the 2018–19 school year, Robinson's grade 9–12 student body was 59.05% White, 13.69% Asian, 14.66% Hispanic, 5.89% Black and 6.71% other races. The grade 7–8 student body was 57.46% White, 13.27% Asian, 14.92% Hispanic, 6.68% Black and 7.67% other races.

Athletics

LSD scandal
In 1991, Robinson was the center of an LSD trafficking scandal in which a drug ring sold more than 100,000 doses of LSD over two years.  The ring was exposed when a 16-year-old Robinson student shot and wounded a Fairfax police officer. In the course of the investigation it was revealed that six Robinson and Lake Braddock graduates were receiving large quantities of the drug through the mail.  One of the men who was facing the harshest penalties faked suicide and fled the area, only to be caught two years later in St. Louis and sentenced to 24 years in prison with no possibility of parole.

Notable alumni

Dan Adams (Class of 2003) – linebacker, Holy Cross and US National Team; Current NCAA record holder
Samir Badr (Class of 2010) – professional soccer player
Bonnie X Clyde members Daniel Litman and Paige Lopynski (Class of 2011) – EDM musicians 
Dave Brockie (Class of 1981) – founder, guitarist, and vocalist of GWAR
Shawn Camp (Class of 1994) – Philadelphia Phillies relief pitcher
Drew Courtney (Class of 2008) – former professional tennis player
Steve Dunn (Class of 1988) – retired Minnesota Twins first baseman
Jill Ellis (Class of 1984) – head coach, United States women's national soccer team
Scott Ellis (Class of 1975) – Broadway director; five-time Tony Award nominee, Emmy nominee; received the Drama Desk Award
Mike Imoh (Class of 2002) – running back, Virginia Tech and Montreal Alouettes of CFL
Lucas Kozeniesky (Class of 2013) – competitor for standing men's 10 metre air rifle in the 2016 Rio de Janeiro Olympics.
Jae Lee (Class of 1990) - artist who worked for various publishers, including Marvel Comics, DC Comics, Image Comics, and Dynamite Entertainment.
Kjell N. Lindgren (Class of 1991) – NASA astronaut who spent five months on the International Space Station as part of Expedition 44 in 2015
Javier Lopez (Class of 1995) – former San Francisco Giants relief pitcher
Carmen Lynch (Class of 1990) - stand-up comedian
Megan McCarthy (Class of 1984) – American former international soccer player
Rob Muzzio (Class of 1982) - Two Time NCAA Decathlon Champion, Finished 5th in Decathlon in 1992 Olympics.  
Joel Patten (Class of 1976) – tight end and tackle at Duke, NFL tackle with Cleveland Browns, Indianapolis Colts, San Diego Chargers, and L.A. Raiders.  USFL tackle with the Washington Federals and Orlando Renegades.
Alex Riley (Class of 1999) – pro wrestler
Byron Saxton – pro wrestling personality
Mike Schleibaum (Class of 1996) – guitarist of Darkest Hour 
Scott Urick (Class of 1995) – 2006 U.S. Men's National Team in World Lacrosse Championship; former Georgetown Hoyas assistant coach; current head lacrosse coach for the University of the District of Columbia
Chip Vaughn – safety for the Saskatchewan Roughriders of the CFL and New Orleans Saints
Brandon Wardell (Class of 2011) – stand-up comedian
Chris Warren (Class of 1985) – NFL running back with Seattle Seahawks, Dallas Cowboys, and Philadelphia Eagles
Kevin Whitaker (Class of 1975) – US Ambassador to Colombia (2014–2019)

References

External links
 
MaxPreps.com – Robinson Rams
VHSL-Reference 
Virginia Preps Rivals.com VHSL Coaching records (inactive coaches)

Public high schools in Virginia
High schools in Fairfax County, Virginia
Secondary schools in Fairfax County, Virginia
Northern Virginia Scholastic Hockey League teams
International Baccalaureate schools in Virginia
Public middle schools in Virginia
1971 establishments in Virginia
Educational institutions established in 1971